Joseph Walker Pease (1820 - 22 November 1882) was a Conservative Party politician.

Despite his Quaker beliefs, Pease was an enthusiast for the Volunteer movement and on 11 August 1860 was appointed Lieutenant-Colonel in command of the 1st (Consolidated) Battalion, East Yorkshire Rifle Volunteers. Until it built Londesborough Barracks in Kingston upon Hull as its drill hall in 1864, the battalion drilled at the Cyclops Foundry, in which Pease had a commercial interest.

He was elected Conservative MP for Kingston upon Hull at a by-election in 1873 but lost the seat very soon after at the 1874 general election.

References

External links
 

Conservative Party (UK) MPs for English constituencies
UK MPs 1868–1874
1820 births
1882 deaths